Office du Niger Sports is a Malian football club. They play in the Malien Premiere Division.

Football clubs in Mali